This page presents the results of the men's and women's volleyball tournament during the 1959 Pan American Games, which was held from August 28 to September 6, 1959 in Chicago, United States.

Men's indoor tournament

Preliminary round

Final Round

Final ranking

Women's indoor tournament

Preliminary round robin

Final ranking

References
 
 
 

1959
Events at the 1959 Pan American Games
Pan American Games
1959 Pan American Games
Volleyball in Chicago